Ciutat Meridiana is a station on line 11 of the Barcelona Metro.

Built in 2003, this single-platform station is located 50 metres below the surface, with three high-speed elevators linking the platform to the single access at Avinguda Rasos de Peguera.

See also
List of Barcelona Metro stations

External links
Ciutat Meridiana (trenscat.cat)

Transport in Nou Barris
Barcelona Metro line 11 stations
Railway stations in Spain opened in 2003